Oscar Peterson: Black + White is a Canadian documentary film, directed by Barry Avrich and released in 2021. The film is a portrait of influential Canadian jazz icon Oscar Peterson, featuring interviews with and performances of his music by figures including Billy Joel, Jon Batiste, Quincy Jones, Ramsey Lewis, Herbie Hancock, Branford Marsalis, Dave Young, Larnell Lewis, Jackie Richardson, Joe Sealy, Measha Brueggergosman, Denzal Sinclaire and Robi Botos.

The film premiered at the 2021 Toronto International Film Festival. It was distributed in Canada by Bell Media as a Crave Original, and internationally by Fremantle Media.

Awards

References

External links

2021 films
2021 documentary films
Canadian documentary films
Documentary films about jazz music and musicians
Documentary films about Black Canadians
2020s English-language films
2020s Canadian films
Films directed by Barry Avrich